The Eagle Tavern is one of the earliest surviving structures in Watkinsville, Oconee County, Georgia, United States. The Eagle Tavern was built circa 1801 but possibly as early as 1794.  In the early part of the 19th century, the city of Watkinsville, Georgia was on the frontier of Creek and Cherokee Indian Territories. The site of the tavern may also have been the site of Fort Edwards, a gathering place for settlers seeking protection from attack by the Creek and Cherokee. The building housed a hotel until about 1930. The tavern was added to the National Register of Historic Places on 13 May 1970.

The Eagle Tavern is open weekly for tours. The Eagle Tavern has also been a popular spot for paranormal investigators. A book, Haunted Atlanta and Beyond, called it the "most haunted building in North Georgia."

References

External links
 The Official Oconee County Tourism Website
 The City of Watkinsville
 Georgia Historical Society_Eagle Tavern Museum
 Explore Georgia_Eagle Tavern Museum

Commercial buildings completed in 1801
Buildings and structures in Oconee County, Georgia
Commercial buildings on the National Register of Historic Places in Georgia (U.S. state)
Museums in Oconee County, Georgia
Reportedly haunted locations in Georgia (U.S. state)
History museums in Georgia (U.S. state)
National Register of Historic Places in Oconee County, Georgia